Oakwood is an unincorporated town in Buchanan County, Virginia, located at the intersection of U.S. Route 460 and Secondary Route 624. The Appalachian College of Pharmacy is in Oakwood, on the campus of the former Garden High School.

The Oakwood post office was established in 1938. The community was likely named for the valuable oak timber in the area.

External links

References

Unincorporated communities in Buchanan County, Virginia
Unincorporated communities in Virginia